Luis Fernando Télles González (born 9 March 1992 in León, Guanajuato) is a Mexican professional footballer who plays as a midfielder for Spanish club Cacereño.

Club career 
In 2010, Telles was offered a contract by Atlas FC and he went on to play there for three years. Telles was mainly used as a "super sub" in games and rarely ever was featured in the team's starting eleven. Telles spent time developing at Atlas, but in his 3-year career there, he only appeared in 15 games and did not score a goal. In December 2013, Telles was loaned out to Universidad Guadalajara. There in his first season, he and his team won the league Ascenso MX on penalties. His first season there he played seven games and scored a goal. The next season, he was purchased full-time as a member of Universidad Guadalajara. In his first full season, he made 31 appearances and scored two goals. That season was probably his best one yet.

International career 
In 2009 Luis Telles was called up to play for the Mexico national under-17 team at the 2009 FIFA U-17 World Cup. He made 3 appearances for the club and played well enough to make his name somewhat known with teams.

References

External links

Living people
1992 births
Mexican footballers
Sportspeople from León, Guanajuato
Footballers from Guanajuato
Association football midfielders
Liga MX players
Ascenso MX players
Liga Premier de México players
Tercera División de México players
Atlas F.C. footballers
Leones Negros UdeG footballers
FC Juárez footballers
Club Celaya footballers
Cafetaleros de Chiapas footballers
Segunda División B players
Salamanca CF UDS players
Mexican expatriate footballers
Mexican expatriate sportspeople in Spain
Expatriate footballers in Spain